Guillermo del Valle Reyes (born 28 February 1964) is a Mexican politician affiliated with the Institutional Revolutionary Party. He served as Deputy of the LIX Legislature of the Mexican Congress representing Morelos, as well as the Congress of Morelos.

References

1964 births
Living people
Politicians from Oaxaca
Institutional Revolutionary Party politicians
Universidad Autónoma del Estado de Morelos alumni
Members of the Congress of Morelos
Deputies of the LIX Legislature of Mexico
Members of the Chamber of Deputies (Mexico) for Morelos